Tang Yi (born 8 January 1993) is a Chinese competitive swimmer. Specializing in the freestyle, she swam for China at the 2008 Summer Olympics and won a bronze medal in the 100 metre freestyle at the 2012 Summer Olympics. She was born in Shanghai.

In addition to her Olympic medal, Tang has won six gold medals at the 2010 Summer Youth Olympics, eight medals (six gold, two silver) at the Asian Games, seven medals (two gold, one silver, four bronze) at the World Championships, and four medals (two gold, two bronze) at the Summer Universiade.

Major achievements
 2006 World Junior Championships – 2nd 200m free;
 2006 Asian Games – 1st 4 × 200 m freestyle relay;
 2006 Shanghai Winter Championships – 1st 200m freestyle;
 2007 World Youth Day Tournament – 1st 200m freestyle;
 2007 Japan International Invitational – 2nd 4 × 100 m freestyle relay;
 2007 World Championships – 7th 4 × 100 m freestyle relay;
 2008 National Championships & Olympic Selective Trials – 4th 100m freestyle
 2010 Summer Youth Olympics – 1st Mixed 4 × 100 m freestyle relay
 2010 Summer Youth Olympics – 1st Women's 100m freestyle
 2010 Summer Youth Olympics – 1st Women' 4 × 100 m freestyle relay 
 2010 Summer Youth Olympics – 1st Women's 200m freestyle
 2010 Summer Youth Olympics – 1st Women's 50m freestyle
 2010 Summer Youth Olympics – 1st Mixed' 4 × 100 m medley relay

See also
 China at the 2012 Summer Olympics#Swimming

References

External links
 http://2008teamchina.olympic.cn/index.php/personview/personsen/786

 

 
  
 

1993 births
Living people
Olympic swimmers of China
Swimmers from Shanghai
Swimmers at the 2008 Summer Olympics
Swimmers at the 2012 Summer Olympics
Swimmers at the 2016 Summer Olympics
Swimmers at the 2010 Summer Youth Olympics
World record setters in swimming
Chinese female freestyle swimmers
World Aquatics Championships medalists in swimming
Olympic bronze medalists for China
Olympic bronze medalists in swimming
Medalists at the FINA World Swimming Championships (25 m)
Asian Games medalists in swimming
Swimmers at the 2006 Asian Games
Swimmers at the 2010 Asian Games
Swimmers at the 2014 Asian Games
Medalists at the 2012 Summer Olympics
Asian Games gold medalists for China
Asian Games silver medalists for China
Asian Games bronze medalists for China
Medalists at the 2006 Asian Games
Medalists at the 2010 Asian Games
Medalists at the 2014 Asian Games
Universiade medalists in swimming
Universiade gold medalists for China
Universiade bronze medalists for China
Youth Olympic gold medalists for China
Medalists at the 2011 Summer Universiade
21st-century Chinese women